Telling Tales is a 2004 anthology of works celebrating life, edited and organized by Nadine Gordimer as a fundraiser for South Africa's Treatment Action Campaign, which lobbies for government funding for HIV/AIDS prevention and care.

It includes 21 short stories by award-winning writers, including five Nobel laureates. Authors include:
 Chinua Achebe
 Woody Allen
 Margaret Atwood
 Nadine Gordimer
 Günter Grass
 Hanif Kureishi
 Claudio Magris
 Gabriel García Márquez
 Arthur Miller
 Es'kia Mphahlele
 Njabulo Ndebele
 Kenzaburō Ōe
 Amos Oz
 Salman Rushdie
 José Saramago
 Ingo Schulze
 Susan Sontag
 Paul Theroux
 Michel Tournier
 John Updike
 Christa Wolf

2004 anthologies
Fiction anthologies